Kuwait competed at the 2011 World Aquatics Championships in Shanghai, China between July 16 and 31, 2011.

Diving

Kuwait has qualified 2 athletes in diving.

Men

Swimming

Kuwait qualified 2 swimmers.

Men

References

Nations at the 2011 World Aquatics Championships
2011 in Kuwaiti sport
Athletics in Kuwait
Kuwait at the World Aquatics Championships
FINA Independent athletes